Qiantang is a town in Hechuan District, Chongqing, China.

References

Township-level divisions of Chongqing